Robben is both a given name and a patronymic surname with origins in North Brabant, Drenthe and Emsland. People with the name include:

Surname
 Arjen Robben (born 1984), Dutch former professional footballer
Jaap Robben (born 1984), Dutch author and playwright
 Jens Robben (born 1983), German football midfielder
 (born 1984), Dutch handball player, sister of Miranda
 (born 1986), Dutch handball player, sister of Jolanda

Given name:
 Robben Wright Fleming (1916–2010), American academic and University president
 Robben Ford (born 1951), American guitarist

See also
 Robben Island, South African island ("seals island")
 HZC De Robben, a Dutch swimming club ("the seals")
 Robbe (surname)
 Robin (name)
 Robins (disambiguation)

References

Dutch-language surnames
Low German surnames
Patronymic surnames
Surnames from given names